A chaiwala (also spelled as chaiwalah or chaiwallah;) is a tea-seller in the Indian subcontinent. They are an integral part of subcontinent culture. Chai is the Hindi/Urdu word for "tea", as in masala chai, and wala indicates the person performing the task, so chaiwala is a street seller of tea.

Chaiwalas, as an entrepreneurial group, tend to move from different regions of India to run their small business in major cities. They boil a mixture of water and milk, often with spices or a spice mixture called chai masala, add tea leaves and sugar and then strain the tea into containers or a tea kettle. They usually serve tea in a small glasses or unglazed clay teacups (kulhar) but, in the modern era, they have started to serve tea in plastic cups. Traditionally, tea was made in brass vessels.

In popular culture
In the 1955 film Shri 420, the hero (Raj Kapoor) brings the heroine (Nargis) to a road-side tea stall. The chaiwala insists on receiving a payment of two annas (anna is 1/16th of a rupee) for the two cups. The scene serves as a prelude for the famous song "Pyar Hua Ikrar Hua", during which the chaiwala is shown sipping the tea from a saucer (which was common among the unsophisticated people). In the 2009 film Slumdog Millionaire, the lead character, Jamal Malik (played by Dev Patel), is a chaiwala in an Indian call center.

In literature 
The 2021 children's book Chaiwala! by Priti Birla Maheshwari "Sweetly captures a slice of Indian life." while telling the story of a little girl's experience getting chai with her mother at a train station in India. The book is published in Canada by OwlKids Books and illustrated by Ashley Barron.

Notable examples 
The press has noted several successful chaiwalas: They include: 

 Indian Prime Minister Narendra Modi started off by his father's side as a Chiwala (tea-seller)  
Former Chief Minister of Bihar and RJD Chief Lalu Prasad Yadav stated that he was once a chaiwala.
 Laxman Rao of Delhi, author of 24 books
A high school dropout started the brand THE CHAI WALAH is empowering aspiring Indian youth entrepreneurs to get in entrepreneurship.

See also
 Street Vendors (Protection of Livelihood and Regulation of Street Vending) Bill, 2012
Tea lady, a similar occupation in Britain

References

Indian tea
Narendra Modi